The PETA revolt in Blitar was an anti-occupation revolt in present-day Indonesia, which took place on 14 February 1945 by the PETA daidan (battalion) in Blitar. This revolt was widely known as the first major uprising of local armies in Indonesia during the Japanese occupation. The revolt ended unsuccessfully, where most of the rebels left the attack, or were captured or killed by the Japanese. Nevertheless, the government of Indonesia acknowledged the revolt as a meaningful revolution. Since his fate is unknown, in 1975 President Suharto issued Presidential Decree no.63 of 1975 officially acknowledged Supriyadi, the leader of rebels, as a national hero of Indonesia.

Background

Arrival of the Japanese in Indonesia

Upon occupation by Nazi Germany, the Dutch had to hand over the Dutch East Indies, its colony, to imperial Japan,  only few months after the first German attack. The arrival of the Japanese occupiers in March 1942 was celebrated by Indonesians who had  suffered under the colonial Dutch. Japan was thought to be a  savior who would chase the Western colonials away, and bring independence for the Indonesian people.

Unlike its Dutch predecessors, or other Western colonials in South East Asia, the Japanese tried to encourage, if not boost, national sentiments of the local people from the very beginning of its arrival, so that they would support the Japanese occupation of Indonesia.  The Japanese military forces did not suppress nor restrain Indonesian people's desire for sovereignty for their nation. Instead, Indonesia Raya was allowed to be played in the middle of the city street, and ‘Sang Merah Putih’, the national flag of Indonesia could be displayed everywhere.

Japan tried to spread propaganda, to make sure that Indonesians perceived imperial Japan as a friend who came to help liberate the nation, instead of as an enemy who exploited resources of the Archipelago. Numerous prominent figures of Indonesia politics, who took a firm stand against the Dutch, for instance, Sukarno and Hatta, agreed to collaborate with the Japanese military forces in order to promote the independence of nation, and defend themselves from the returning Dutch.

The Formation of PETA

The kindness of Japan to Indonesia was not free of cost. Japan tried to conscript the young generation of Indonesia to supplement the personnel in its military forces. Adding more personnel was very critical for the Japanese military forces. However, Gatot Mangkupradja, one of very pro-Japanese nationalist figures opposed Japan's idea of conscription. Instead, he proposed a volunteer-based military personnel recruitment for the battalion as the Volunteer Army of Homeland Defenders, or Tentara Sukarela Pembela Tanah Air in Indonesian, called PETA. Gatot argues that Indonesian young men have their right to freely choose what they want to, and also take the consequence of his choice. It is said that Gatot wrote the petition with his blood, thus the heart of Japanese commandant who read it was greatly touched.

The response from Indonesian youth was impressive, where thousands applied to join PETA, and the Japanese military forces felt satisfied as well. The spirit of voluntarism made many Indonesian believe that PETA army was an indigenous army that was created to liberate the nation of Indonesia. Also, looking at the social background of PETA officers, most of the officers who voluntarily joined PETA were from the high strata of Indonesian society. Thus, fewer people assumed that PETA was formed to serve military purposes of the colonial Japan. PETA's role was to protect the homeland from the external threat such as the Dutch, ex-colonialist, and the Allied Forces, but Japan was not one of them.  Later, many former PETA officers became the leaders of Indonesian military forces after the independence, for instance, Sudirman and Soeharto.

Continuous suffering 

Indonesia's huge population was not the only resources that the imperial Japan coveted. Indonesia was a country with the largest territory and richest natural resources, valuable for imperial Japan which was in the middle of fierce struggle of World War II. Japan's policy in Indonesia, therefore, were very economic-oriented as well.

Japan used Java as its operation base for the entire South East Asia, thus Java was one of the most oppressed places in Indonesia during the occupation. The Javanese farmers were forced to plant rice and sell it only to the Japanese organization at a very low price. In consequence, the farmers had nothing much to eat no matter how great the harvest was. They also could not buy some foods in the market because of shortage of supply, since all farmers had to sell their rice to the Japanese organization only, and lack of money, for the farmers received very small amount of money in exchange for their harvest. At the end of 1944, more than 2.4 million Javanese died because of starvation. Nobody was an exception in the Japanese cruelty. Almost every man and woman in their productive age were recruited to join rōmusha (the Japanese word for Indonesian forced labourers). Many of them died helpless due to continuous working, illness without any proper food or medication. Many Indonesian women were also deceived and sent away from their homes, eventually ended up as comfort women for the Japanese forces all over South East Asia.

Injustice also took place within the PETA itself. Japan behaved unfairly and discriminated against Indonesian civilians and also PETA soldiers. PETA officers had to be respectful to every Japanese soldier, no matter what rank they held. Cultural differences also played a major role in the occurrence of dispute between Indonesians and the Japanese within the PETA. While a slap to men under his command is a common way for the Japanese soldiers to tighten and maintain discipline, in Indonesia even just to touch the head of others, no matter what your rank, is regarded as rude, abusive, and affronting behavior. So when the Japanese used their hand in their usual way, most Indonesian military personnel felt insulted by the foreigner.

Looking at the miserable condition of their people, the PETA battalion personnel started to lose hope for an independent Indonesia with a bright future. They felt that neither the Dutch nor the Japanese had any right to keep Indonesian people suffering. In summary, the three main reasons of Supriyadi, the instigator of the rebellion, to revolt were “the plight of civilians and rōmusha, Japanese arrogance, and the need for real independence.”

Chronology of the revolt

It is a bit unclear who precisely proposed the revolt first. However, Supriyadi, who was less than 22 years old at the time, started to gather some trusted members, and held secret meetings to plan the action starting in September 1944, which continued until the sixth meeting on 13 February 1945. In their last meeting, the rebels decided to attack the city divided into four groups. At the following day, the rebels attacked two buildings that usually were used by the Japanese military forces, aiming to kill every single Japanese they would meet. However, the attack was completely predicted by the Japanese military forces, thus all the buildings were abandoned before the attack began.

After their attack failed, each group of the rebels quickly left the city to find other groups of the rebels, and range again against Japan. However, there were two main problems faced by the rebels to carry out their plans. First, Japan used other Indonesian personnel under the Japanese command to threaten the rebels. This was quite successful. The rebels did not want to kill other Indonesian PETA soldiers who were forced by the Japanese army to confront their revolt. Second, the Japanese military forces succeeded in isolating the Blitar battalion completely.  The separation of the military command structure of PETA worked effectively, thus not many groups of Indonesian militaries even in the same region, would hear about the news in Blitar. All rebels were scattered, and many of them were persuaded to go back to Blitar, or chose to surrender to the Japanese. A few of the groups successfully killed some of the Japanese, but all of them were shot back and killed.

Finally, fifty-five captured rebels were being sent to the military court after several sessions of interrogation, and six among them were sentenced to death, while Supriyadi disappeared without a trace.

Significance

Although the revolt was by no means successful, it left some significant influence to both Japan and Indonesia. 1945 PETA revolt in Blitar was an important event that indicating the changes of Indonesia's feeling toward Japan. Benedict Anderson, an influential Southeast Asia academic who is also an Indonesian expert, argues that the Blitar revolt might not seize the colonial Japan with a great fear, yet, it successfully created the anxious atmosphere among the Japanese forces to be wary of changing situation in Java. Anderson shows some evidence supporting his argument, for instance, that the Japanese military tried to avoid direct condemnation of the revolt by inviting prominent Indonesian leaders in the judicial process. The Japanese court also pronounced relatively generous sentence of punishment to the rebels. In general, the revolt was the most serious attack on Japanese military forces during its occupation in Indonesia which opened the new revolutionary period for Indonesia.

Meanwhile, for Indonesian people, the revolt of PETA battalion in Blitar was seen as a strong message to the Japanese forces which behaved unfair to Indonesian people. Although the PETA rebellion in Blitar was very short and unsuccessful; however, it played a vital role in Indonesian independence by transmitting “the revolutionary energy” (p. 153) to PETA soldiers in other areas of Indonesia. Lebra Joyce, an American historian of Japan and India, publishes a book, “Japanese-trained Armies in Southeast Asia”, and in Chapter 6 of her book, “Revolt of the Independence Armies,” she exposes how the battalion in Rengasdengklok was influenced by the Blitar revolt later, and eventually kidnapped Sukarno and Hatta to proclaim the independence of Indonesia on the night of 16 August 1945. Lebra, therefore, concludes that 1945 PETA revolt in Blitar did not completely fail in achieving its ultimate goal: Indonesian independence.

Controversies and alternative perspectives
Historical reality, after all, need not be embellished or hidden in order for Indonesians to be proud of their history
                                                                                                                                                                                             - Sato - 
Nugroho Notosusanto, an Indonesian military historian, comprehensively presents the motives, process, and termination of the Blitar revolt in his famous article “The Revolt of a PETA-Battalion in Blitar.” Some Indonesian historians wrote about the revolt of PETA in Blitar before him; however, Notosusanto is the first Indonesian historian writing in English. Thus, Notosusanto's contribution in promoting the history of Blitar revolt is enormous. Without his works, the story of Blitar revolt would be less known nor widely distributed among academics. His effort to conduct numerous interviews with many people who were concerned with the revolt is a praiseworthy deed. His works become the most cited academic literature relating to 1945 PETA revolt in Blitar among scholars even until now.

However, some also draw sharp criticism of Notosusanto's firm belief that 1945 PETA revolt in Blitar was a rebellion exclusively conducted based on the strong nationalism of PETA leaders and soldiers. Shigeru Sato, an expert in Japanese occupation in Southeast Asia during World War II, confronts every aspect of Notosusanto's narrative regarding 1945 PETA revolt in Blitar. Sato might be the first academic criticizing Notosusanto's works since it was published in 1969. Sato introduces another important view on the revolt in Blitar: Japan's perspective. Sato does not completely reject nationalism as one of driving force in the rebellion; however, he puts less value of Indonesian nationalism in both the revolt and its leader, Supriyadi. Sato argues that the revolt was rather “an isolated case caused by specific problems” than nationalism based rebellion against Japan. It says that there is a possibility that Supriyadi, the leader of rebels, was impelled to revolt, not because of his nationalism or hatred of Japan, but over a small dispute over some Indonesian girls. Also, Supriyadi is held in respect as a national hero by Indonesia, and he was even inaugurated as in absentia Minister of the People's Security in Indonesia's first cabinet formed in 1945. However, Sato refers to the interviews of Japanese officers at the time who gave less credit to Supriyadi as a great leader, because at the end of the revolt, Supriyadi ran away leaving his rebels, and never appeared again. Sato delivers a cynical interpretation of the Japanese forces on the Blitar revolt. Sato criticizes Notosusanto, and other historians following him, for attributing the cause of the rebellion too deeply to nationalism.

This alternative argument is based on the odd background of Notosusanto as a historian as well as the chaotic political situation in Indonesia when his works were published. In his young days, Notosusanto dreamed of being a military officer, but was opposed by his father. In 1964, Notosusanto was a history lecturer at University of Indonesia when General Nasution of Indonesian Army Forces asked him to write an army version of Indonesian independence history. Since after that, Notosusanto became an official historian of New Order who reinforced the ideology of “anti-communism, militarism, and developmentalism” held by the Soeharto's regime. In other words, Notosusanto intentionally writes history that emphasizes the critical role of Indonesia army, including PETA, during the independence struggle of Indonesia, to justify Indonesian army forces’ intervention in politics, social, and defense areas under Soeharto. It is not surprising that Katherine MeGregor, a historian of Indonesia in University of Melbourne who writes a book regarding Notosusanto's role during Soeharto's dictatorship, calls Notosusanto as “a central propagandist of the New Regime” of Indonesia. Sato criticizes that the history can be misused as a tool of ideology in authoritarian government, and Notosusanto is a good example of it.

Some scholars also claim alternative arguments regarding the motives behind the rebellion of PETA battalion in Blitar. However, unlike Sato, these scholars do not confront nor refute Notosusanto's mainstream perspective. Rather, they add other factors that might contribute to the outbreak of the rebellion. George M. Kahin, an American historian who is also an expert on Southeast Asia, discusses the possibility of PKI's influence in the Blitar revolt. In his book, “Nationalism and Revolution in Indonesia,” Kahin argues that the anti-Japanese movement led by Syarifuddin and other members of PKI (Indonesian Communist Party) since early 1943 contributed to the outbreak of PETA revolt in Blitar in February 1945. Another interesting perspective is argued by Yu Byung-sun, an editorial writer of Korean journal, in his article “Anti-Japanese Struggle of Korean Civilian Workers Attached to the Japanese Military in Indonesia in the late Stages of Japanese Imperialism.” In examining the Ambara incident which was an anti-Japanese armed resistance by the Korean civilian worker in Indonesia happened only forty days before the Blitar revolt, Yu argues that the Ambara incident indirectly inspired the outbreak of Blitar revolt.

Recommended reading

Anderson, Benedict.  Some aspects of Indonesian politics under the Japanese occupation, 1944–1945. (Ithaca, NY: Cornell University, 1961).Kahin, George M.  Nationalism and Revolution in Indonesia. (Ithaca, NY: Cornell University, 2003).Lebra, Joyce. C. Japanese-trained Armies in Southeast Asia. (Singapore: Institute of Southeast Asian Studies, 2010).

McGregor, Katharine E. History in Uniform: Military Ideology and the Construction of Indonesia's Past. Singapore: NUS Press, 2007a.

Notosusanto, Nugroho. “The Revolt of a PETA-Battalion in Blitar.” Asian Studies 1969; 7(1): 111–123.

Notosusanto, Nugroho. The Revolt against the Japanese of a PETA-Battalion in Blitar, February 14, 1945. (Jakarta: Dept. of Defence and Security, Centre for Armed Forces History, 1974)

Notosusanto, Nugroho. “The PETA Army in Indonesia.” in Japan in Asia, 1942-1945 (eds. William H. N), (Singapore: Singapore University Press, 1981).

Sato, Shigeru. “Gatot Mangkupraja, PETA, and the origins of the Indonesian National Army.” Bijdragen tot de Taal-, Lan-en Volenkunde 2010; 166(2/3): 189–217.

Yu, Byung-sun. “Anti-Japanese Struggle of Korean Civilian Workers Attached to the Japanese Military in Indonesia in the late Stages of Japanese Imperialism.” Journal of Korean Independence Movement Studies 2013; 44:207-245

References

Pembela Tanah Air
Conflicts in 1945
Indonesia in World War II
Indonesia
1945 in Indonesia